Dolichoglottis is a genus of flowering plants in the daisy family, Asteraceae.

 Species
 Dolichoglottis lyallii (Hook.f.) B.Nord. -New Zealand South Island
 Dolichoglottis scorzoneroides (Hook.f.) B.Nord. - New Zealand South Island

References

Senecioneae
Asteraceae genera
Endemic flora of New Zealand